Liu E may refer to:

Liu E (Han Zhao) (died 314), Liu Cong's empress
Empress Liu (Zhenzong) (969–1033), Emperor Zhenzong of Song's empress, usually called Liu E in legends
Liu E (writer) (1857–1909), Chinese antiquarian, novelist and minor government official